Water polo was contested for men only at the 1959 Central American and Caribbean Games in Caracas, Venezuela.

References
 

1959 Central American and Caribbean Games
1959
1959 in water polo